Peter Aloysius Meechan (born 29 January 1980) is a British composer, conductor, and music publisher.

Life 
Meechan studied musical composition at the Royal Northern College of Music in Manchester and received his Bachelor of Arts. He then studied at the University of Salford in Salford and received his PhD in musical composition. Currently, he is a musical assistant of Foden's Band, a brass band from Sandbach in the English county of Cheshire.

He mostly writes works for concert and brass bands, but also for chamber ensembles and winds. His works for brass bands are often chosen as compulsory works for musical festivals and competitions. His works for concert band have been performed at the annual Midwest Clinic in Chicago and at the International Wind Festival held by the British Association of Symphonic Bands and Wind Ensembles by orchestras such as the Eastman Wind Ensemble, the Royal Northern College of Music Wind Orchestra, the Kew Wind Orchestra, and the Band of the Coldstream Guards. In 2006, he set up his own music publication company, Meechan Music. From 2006 to 2007, he was the composer of the well-known Black Dyke Band.

Compositions

Works for concert band and brass band

 2001-2002 Revamp, for brass band
 2002 Crazy Diamonds Shining, for soprano saxophone and concert band
 2002-2003 Three Stories - Three Worlds, concert for euphonium and brass band or concert band
 Hubris: The House of Atreus
 Discardation: Lament for Aerope
 New Order: Flight to Sparta
 2004 Elegy, for solo euphonium (or trombone) and brass band or concert band
 2004 Purcell Variants, for brass band
 2005 Alu, for Baritone (or euphonium ) and brass band
 2005 B of the Bang, for brass band (dedicated to Luc Vertommen) - premiered during the World Music Competition  in Kerkrade by the Brass Band Buizingen
 2005 Episodes and Echoes, for solo tuba and brass band or concert band
 2005 Match Day, for brass band or concert band
 2005 Requiem Paraphrases - on a theme by Mozart, for euphonium and brass band or concert band
 2006 Carnival, for concert band
 2006 Devil's Duel, for solo euphonium and brass band
 2006 Lift Off, for concert band
 2006 Hymn for Africa, for concert band
 2006 Red Flame, for euphonium (of baritone) and brass band
 2007 Apex, for trumpet (or cornet, bugle) and brass band
 2007 Bang 2, for concert band
 2007 Fanfare for a Festival, for brass band of concert band
 2007 Macbeth, for brass band or concert band
 Witches
 Dagger
 General Macbeth
 Contemplations of Lady Macbeth
 Lament
 Tomorrow and tomorrow and tomorrow
 A spell still cast
 Final Battle
 Not of woman born
 2007 These Mist Covered Mountains, for soprano saxophone (or alto saxophone) and concert band of for cornet en brass band
 2008 Apex, for trumpet and concert band
 2008 Apophenia, for trumpet and concert band of brass band
 2008 Autumn Falling, for concert band
 2008 Curtain Call, for brass band
 2008 Devil's Duel, for solo euphonium solo and concert band
 2008 Eternal Light, for concert band (dedicated to Geoffrey Brand and Michael Brand)
 2008 Lament (from Macbeth), for brass band or concert band 
 2009 Epitaph (for Hillsborough), for brass band (or concert band) - in memory of the 96 victims of the Hillsborough disaster 
 2009 Scene From the Silver Plate, for trombone and brass band
 2009 The Kármán Line, for concert band
 2010 Chorlton Suite, for concert band
 Introduction
 Sunset
 Toccata
 2010 Fenix Blue, for solo alto saxophone solo and concert band
 2010 Fire in the Sky, for brass band
 2010 Manchester Concertino, for cornet (or trumpet) and brass band
 Fanfare
 Dream
 Finale
 2010 Sentinel, for brass band
 2010 Shine, for solo tuba and brass band
 2010 The Legend of King Arthur, for brass band of concert band
 2010 Triptych (on a theme by Handel), for tenor horn and brass band
 Fanfare and theme
 Slow song
 Finale
 2011 2nd Epitaph – Across the Water, for  brass band or concert band
 Fields of Destruction, 3 songs for euphonium and concert band

Chamber music 

 Break It Down, for trombone quartet
 Floating Dreams, for tuba and CD
 Introduction and Toccata, for tenor horn and piano
 JET A, for euphonium and CD
 Manchester Sketches, for brass quartet
 Moz!, for euphonium and brass ensemble (or piano)
 Storm, for brass quintet

References

External links 
 Official website

1980 births
Living people
People from Nuneaton
21st-century British composers
People from Warwickshire